Aldeby is a village and civil parish in the English county of Norfolk. It is bounded to the south by the River Waveney, on the other side of which is Suffolk. The village is about five miles (8 km) by road from Beccles.

History
The name Aldeby derives from the Old Norse word meaning 'old fortification'.
The civil parish has an area of 12.61 square kilometres and in 2001 had a population of 437 in 175 household, falling to a population of 422 in 180 households at the 2011 Census.    For the purposes of local government, the parish falls within the area of the district of South Norfolk.

Aldeby is well known for its fishing pits and also historically for the apple factory (Waveney Apple Growers Ltd) based on Common Road that closed in the late 1990s. It also once had its own Aldeby railway station.

Aldeby is mentioned in the Domesday Book and was part of Clavering hundred. Aldeby Priory was located here.

Between 1959 and 1968, the village was the location of a Royal Observer Corps monitoring bunker, to be used in the event of a nuclear attack. It remains mostly intact.

War Memorial
Saint-Mary-the-Virgin Church holds the village's war memorials. The memorial to the fallen of the First World War holds 23 names which are:

 Company Sergeant-Major Walter R. Snowling (1894-1916), 2nd Battalion, Suffolk Regiment
 Lance-Corporal Frederick H. B. Alp (d.1916), 22nd Battalion, Royal Fusiliers
 Lance-Corporal Benjamin Wright (d.1917), 2nd Battalion, Northamptonshire Regiment
 Lance-Corporal Fred S. Wright (d.1916), 2nd Battalion, Royal Berkshire Regiment
 Shoeing Smith James Eggett (1873-1918), 87th Battery, Royal Field Artillery
 Gunner Alfred A. Manthorpe (d.1918), 252nd Siege Battery, Royal Garrison Artillery
 Private Harold Howes (1894-1918), 33rd Battalion, Royal Fusiliers
 Private George Alger (d.1917), 7th Battalion, East Surrey Regiment
 Private James H. Rouse (1897-1917), 11th Battalion, Essex Regiment
 Private Arthur E. Self (1895-1916), 1st Battalion, Royal Norfolk Regiment
 Joseph Soanes, 1st Battalion, Royal Norfolk Regiment
 Private Bertie W. Brown (d.1917), 2nd Battalion, Royal Norfolk Regiment
 Private Fred H. Slater (d.1917), 4th Battalion, Royal Norfolk Regiment
 Private Richard W. Slater (1893-1919), 4th Battalion, Royal Norfolk Regiment
 Private Frederick Simpson (d.1915), 10th Battalion, Royal Norfolk Regiment
 Private William Thrower (d.1918), 6th Battalion, Northamptonshire Regiment
 Private Herbert G. Cooper (1896-1915), 1st Battalion, Suffolk Regiment
 Private Allard J. Saker (1896-1915), 1st Battalion, Suffolk Regiment
 Private Henry Newson (d.1919), 11th Battalion, Suffolk Regiment
 Seaman Leonard Alp (1896-1915), HMS Clan MacNaughton
 Chief Cook Harry C. Orpin (d.1915), HMS Pembroke
 Deck-Hand Arthur Soanes (1879-1917), HM Armed trawler Ethel & Millie
 Engineman Fred W. Leathers (1891-1916), HM Drifter Buckler

And the following six names for the Second World War:

 Private Ernest J. Tye (1924-1945), 2nd Battalion, Monmouthshire Regiment
 Pilot Officer Edward M. Gunther (1920-1940), No. 501 Squadron RAF
 Sergeant Jack A. G. Reynolds (1923-1943), No. 44 Squadron RAF
 Sergeant-Air Gunner Edward A. J. Farrow (1926-1945), No. 158 Squadron RAF
 Able Seaman James W. Soanes (1914-1929), HMS Tigris (N63)
 Second-Hand Sidney C. Burroughs (1914-1942), HMS Ullswater

References

 Office for National Statistics & Norfolk County Council, 2001. Census population and household counts for unparished urban areas and all parishes. Retrieved 2 December 2005.
http://kepn.nottingham.ac.uk/map/place/Norfolk/Aldeby

External links
 
 Parish Council
 

Villages in Norfolk
Civil parishes in Norfolk